Poecilotheria hanumavilasumica, also known as the Rameshwaram ornamental, or Rameshwaram parachute spider, is a critically endangered species of tarantula.

Distribution
It was discovered in 2004 by Andrew Smith from a sacred grove of the Hanumavilasum Temple in Rameshwaram.

It was initially thought to be endemic to the Ramanathapuram district in the state of Tamil Nadu, India, but has since been identified outside India in the Mannar District of Northern Sri Lanka. The close proximity of Mannar island to India suggests that the species may have dispersed over the land bridge between the two countries in the Pleistocene epoch.

Identification
In first pair of legs, ground color is daffodil yellow. Femur has a black band three quarters the part. Patella is daffodil yellow with a thin black band distally. Tibia also daffodil yellow with a thick black transverse band.

In fourth pair of legs, ground color is bluish grey, with a black patch proximally. Femur having bluish grey band. Patella also bluish grey with fade black mark distally. Tibia bluish grey.

References

External links
photos

Spiders described in 2004
Spiders of Asia